Ochenta's is the name of Soraya Arnelas's second studio album, released in Spain on November 21, 2006, under the Vale Music label.

Track listing
 "Self Control"
 "Call Me"
 "Don't Go"
 "High Energy"
 "Because the Night"
 "Gonna Get Along Without You Now"
 "Don't You Want Me"
 "Send Me an Angel"
 "Face to Face"
 "Just Can't Get Enough"
 "Tarzan Boy"

Chart performance

Release history

References

2006 albums
Soraya Arnelas albums